Harry Kiyoshi Ishisaka (December 25, 1927January 1978) was a leading sensei, or master of the Japanese martial art of aikido. Founder and chief instructor of the Orange County Aiki Kai for much of his life, he did much to popularize aikido in southern California.  His obituary in Black Belt magazine described him as "one of the foremost practitioners of aikido in America."

Early years
Harry Ishisaka was born on December 25, 1927, in Kealakekua, Hawaii.  
As a child he was involved in different forms of martial arts, including sumo, kendo, judo and boxing. 
He attended Hilo Technical School, where he trained as a heavy-duty mechanic.
He joined the U.S. Army after graduating, and spent some time with the U.S. Army in Japan. 
While there, he studied judo at an advanced level, and he continued his studies in this art after returning to the United States.

The Aikido master Koichi Tohei visited Hawaii in 1953, and taught Aikido to the first American pupils, people of Japanese origins such as Roy Y. Suenaka, Tukuji Hirata and Isao Takahashi.  However, Ishisaka began his studies in aikido only after he had moved to Southern California. 
He was drawn to Aikido by the spiritual aspects of the teachings of Morihei Ueshiba, and trained in California under Koichi Tohei.

Teacher

Ishisaka became one of the first wave of aikidoka in the continental U.S.A.
In 1964 he founded the Westminster Aikido School, and the first Aikido classes were held in the Westminster high school.
Soon after he moved to Garden Grove, California where he launched the Orange County Aiki Kai in a larger facility.
Ishisaka was the chief instructor of Orange County Aikikai for the remainder of his life.
Koichi Tohei supported Ishisaka in founding the Orange County Aiki Kai dojo.
Ishisaka was one of Tohei's students who attended the first U.S. Ki Society organizational meeting at the California State University, Fullerton, when Tohei was breaking away from the mainstream Aikikai organisation. 
For a period the school was affiliated with the Ki Society International, and Ishisaka was an associate lecturer with this organization.
Later Ishisaka became independent of the Ki Society.

Ishisaka was influential in the formation of Aikido societies in the University of California, Irvine and the California State University, Fullerton, and in the introduction of Aikido instruction to the Orange County Department of Mental Health. He participated in various tournaments and exhibitions. 
He taught many pupils. Jerry Glassman, who founded the HAI KI Aiki Center in Eugene, Oregon, was to accept honorary godan (5th dan) in 2000.
Dan Kawakami, 6th dan, is another pupil who went on to become a well-known instructor.
Perhaps his best known pupil was Steven Seagal, who began studying under Ishisaka as a teenager in the mid-1960s.
A fellow student said "[Seagal] was crazy about Harry Ishisaka."
Seagal continued to study at the Orange County Aikikai while making frequent visits to Japan where he studied under other masters, 
before moving to Japan in March 1973.

While leading the OC Aikikai, Ishisaka also held a full-time job as a machinist with a company in El Toro, California.
He had risen to the rank of godan  by the time of his death.
Harry Ishisaka died in mid-January 1978 at the age of fifty, after suffering a heart attack during an Aikido demonstration at Irvine College, California. OC Aikikai hosts an annual Harry Ishisaka memorial seminar.

Philosophy

Ishisaka considered that understanding ki, the underlying life force, was of key importance.
Through ki a person can achieve a harmonious way of life that is healthy and positive.
He practiced ki exercises with his students, and encouraged use of techniques such as controlled deep breathing, meditation and complete relaxation. He also saw ki as a means of anticipating the opponent's moves so they can be avoided, and even of "bending" the opponent's mind and body – leading their ki. He expressed this concept in the formula "move the mind to move the body."

Notes and references
Notes

Citations

Sources

 

1927 births
1978 deaths
American aikidoka
American military personnel of Japanese descent
American sportspeople of Japanese descent